Lurleen B. Wallace Community College (LBWCC) is a public community college with campuses in Andalusia, Greenville, and Opp, Alabama.  As of the fall 2010 semester, the college has an enrollment of 1,790 students across all campuses.  The college was founded in 1969 and named for Governor Lurleen Burns Wallace. In 1992, it opened the campus in Greenville. In 2003, LBWCC merged with Douglas MacArthur State Technical College, which opened in 1965.  Athletic teams representing LBWCC compete in the Alabama Community College Conference of the National Junior College Athletic Association.

References

External links
Official website

Community colleges in Alabama
Educational institutions established in 1969
Education in Covington County, Alabama
Education in Butler County, Alabama
1969 establishments in Alabama
George Wallace